Allison Leigh Whitworth (born December 11, 1985) is a former American football goalkeeper who last played for the Atlanta Beat of Women's Professional Soccer. Currently, Whitworth serves as head coach for the Spring Hill College women's soccer team in Mobile, Alabama.

Career

Professional career
Whitworth played the 2009 Women's Professional Soccer season with FC Gold Pride after being drafted in the 8th round of the 2009 WPS Draft.  She was second string to United States Women's National Team player Nicole Barnhart, but did manage to appear in 4 games (all starts).  She allowed five goals and kept one clean sheet.

Whitworth was traded to Atlanta Beat on 29 October 2009 for draft picks.  She was the first person to be traded in FC Gold Pride's history. On 18 June 2010, Whitworth was traded to the Chicago Red Stars after Chicago's Kelsey Davis suffered a season-ending injury — only to be traded back to the Beat for 2011.

2011 - Started majority of the season with the Atlanta Beat.

2010 - Started 3 games for the Atlanta Beat  making 22 saves on 27 shots (82% save percentage). Was traded to the Chicago Red Stars for draft picks. Started 1 game, making two saves to earn a shut out for the Red Stars against the defending WPS champions Sky Blue FC.

2009- Draft pick for FC Gold for the inaugural WPS season. Started and played in 4 games with the FC Gold Pride allowing 4 goals. Posted her first shutout against the Boston Breakers and first win against the Washington Freedom. (1-2-1) Was the first trade (with the 23rd pick) of the Gold Pride organization to the Atlanta Beat for the 10th and 12th picks in the 2010 WPS draft.

College career
She capped her Tiger career by setting a school record with 356 saves, including another standard and SEC-high of 132 during her senior campaign. The 356 saves place her third in the league record book. She registered 22 career shutouts, including eight during each of her junior and senior years, and tying for eighth in SEC history. Her 1.02 goals-against average as a senior helped her garner First Team All-SEC honors, her second league accolade after picking up a Second Team nod as a junior. Whitworth was chosen as a SEC Defensive Player of the Week in each of her last three seasons, including three times as a senior. She saw action in 73 career matches, posting a 1.13 career goals-against average.

Coaching career

Whitworth began her coaching career at Middle Tennessee where she was an assistant for two seasons in 2012 and 2013. The Blue Raiders went 24-14-1 and recorded 14 shutouts along with claiming a 2012 Sun Belt Conference regular-season championship.

Whitworth spent the next 3 years as the goalkeeper coach and recruit coordinator at Ohio University.

Whitworth's only experience as a Head Coach came at Spring Hill College spanning the 2016, 2017 and 2018 seasons. She amassed a record of 2 wins, 46 losses and 4 draws.

After leaving Spring Hill, Whitworth volunteered to train the goalkeepers at Mississippi State University.

Career statistics

Coaching Statistics

Club statistics

References

External links
 FC Gold Pride player profile
 Auburn player profile
 Mississippi State Volunteer Coach

Living people
FC Gold Pride players
Atlanta Beat (WPS) players
Chicago Red Stars players
Auburn Tigers women's soccer players
American women's soccer players
Women's association football goalkeepers
1985 births
Atlanta Silverbacks Women players
21st-century American women
Women's Professional Soccer players